Kang Chol-hwan (born 18 September 1968) is a North Korean defector, author, and the founder and president of the North Korea Strategy Center.

As a child, he was imprisoned in the Yodok concentration camp for 10 years. After his release he fled the country, first to China and eventually to South Korea. He is the author, with Pierre Rigoulot, of The Aquariums of Pyongyang and worked as a staff writer specialized in North Korean affairs for The Chosun Ilbo.

Early life

According to his autobiography, Kang was born in Pyongyang, North Korea, and spent his childhood there. He had a good relationship with his grandfather. He had a happy childhood. His grandfather was the Vice President of the Commercial Management office in Pyongyang, supervising all the commercial stores and department stores in Pyongyang. His grandmother was a member of the Supreme People’s Assembly and was the deputy head of the Workers’ Party organization of female members. She was deputy to Kim Il Sung’s wife. His family lived in relative luxury from his grandfather's position and the fortune that he had given to the country upon the family's return from Japan. Though they had never renounced their North Korean citizenship and Kang's grandmother had been a staunch party member in both countries, Kang has stated that the family remained under a cloud of suspicion for having lived in Japan.

Concentration camp
In 1977, his grandfather was accused of treason and was sent to the Senghori concentration camp. According to current KCNA, the elder Kang was an agent of the Japanese National Police. As the family of a traitor, Kang, 9, and his family were sent to the Yodok concentration camp.

Kang's autobiography describes a brutal life in the camp. Death from starvation or exposure to the elements was common, with routine beatings and other punishments. His education consisted almost solely of memorizing the sayings and speeches of Kim Il-sung; at 15, his education ceased and he was assigned to exhausting and dangerous work details, and was made to view public executions. He said of the camps, "It was a life of hard labour, thirty percent of new prisoners would die. And we were so malnourished, we would eat rats and earthworms to survive."

There was an order by Kim Jong-il that those in the prison with relatives in Japan had to be released after 10 years. In the mid-1980s North Korea depended heavily on foreign currency remittances. Many Zainichi Koreans or Koreans living in Japan were sending remittances to North Korea. Such people opposed the imprisonment of their relatives in North Korea. The amount of remittances being sent from Japan to North Korea deteriorated due to the wave of mass imprisonment. As such Kang was permitted to be released from prison after serving his 10-year sentencing. Once he left the camp, he was sent to live in Yodok village. He could not go all the way back to Pyongyang, but he moved to Pyongsong, near Pyongyang. He moved in with his uncle who was working at the National Science Research Institute in the city.

Release
After his release from the camp in 1987, Kang bought an illegal radio receiver and listened to broadcasts from South Korea. He was studying and preparing to go to college, but he and his friend An Hyuk, who was a fellow Yodok internee, had found interest in foreign broadcasting. He was quite interested in outside information and eventually got involved in anti-government activity. He was later identified and watched by the government; fearing he would be sent back to the concentration camp, he planned his escape.

He was part of a group of people who were against the regime. He had access to foreign information and sang foreign songs. All of this was strictly prohibited in North Korea and he knew it could put his family at risk as well. When he was discovered, he knew he couldn't discuss the matter with his family. So he left the country as soon as he could. In 1992, he and An Hyuk escaped from North Korea by crossing the Yalu River into China.

The hardest challenge for them was getting on the train to the border of China undetected. All of the North Korean trains were monitored by the authorities. To gain passage, they had to bribe the police to gain permission to travel. Eventually, they made it to the border city of Chanbai, China near Hyesan, North Korea, where they stayed temporarily, making numerous deals with the North Korean military there by buying them beer and drinks. Later, the North Korean military informed them there was a changing of the guard at 2 AM. An Hyuk and Kang took their chance and crossed the river into China without any complications. After they made it across, North Korean patrols came looking for them, searching for about a week. They hid in China for about 6 months and eventually made their way to Dalian, where some Koreans helped them get passage to South Korea.

After publishing The Aquariums of Pyongyang, Kang met with US President George W. Bush and British Foreign Secretary Jack Straw. He has spoken with several organizations about human rights in North Korea and visited Japan for a discussion about abductees. Along with An and Lee Soon-ok, who was imprisoned in Kaechon concentration camp, he received the Democracy Award from the United States' National Endowment for Democracy in July 2003.

Kang has not been in contact with his family since he defected. In 2011, it was assumed that his sister, Mi-ho, and her 11-year-old son are in Yodok concentration camp, having been sent back there as retaliation for Kang's defection.

Bibliography 
 
 "Give Us An 'Eclipse Policy'", The Wall Street Journal, July 13, 2005.

See also
 Human rights in North Korea
 Political prisoner

References

External links

 "Child Prisoner: Kang Chol-hwan", MSN.com article, October 28, 2003.
 "Bush 'Moved By Defector's Book on N.K. Human Rights'", The Chosun Ilbo, May 29, 2005.
 "Ban Downplays Bush Meeting With N.Korean Author", The Chosun Ilbo, June 15, 2005.
 Kang Chol-hwan Freedom Collection interview

1968 births
Living people
Korean writers
North Korean defectors
North Korean human rights activists
North Korean prisoners and detainees
People from Pyongyang
Political repression in North Korea
Prisoners and detainees of North Korea
Zainichi Korean people
Experts on North Korea